Sweet Revenge is a 1994 album by Ryuichi Sakamoto. The Japanese and international releases have different track listings, with the international pressing featuring (uncredited) re-mixes of half of the songs.

A re-recording of "Psychedelic Afternoon", featuring original lyricist David Byrne on vocals and sporting modified lyrics, was released in 2013 as a way to raise money and awareness for children who survived the 2011 Tōhoku earthquake and tsunami. An animated music video was released concurrently with the new version.

Track listing

Personnel
 Ryuichi Sakamoto – keyboards, programming, percussion, vocals
 J-Me – vocals
 Vivien Sessoms – vocals
 Holly Johnson – vocals
 Latasha Natasha Diggs – vocals
 Paul Alexander – vocals
 Arto Lindsay – vocals
 Roddy Frame – vocals
 Miki Imai – vocals
 Towa Tei – programming
 Satoshi Tomiie – programming and arrangements
 Cyro Baptista – percussion
 Amadeo Pace – guitar
 David Nadien – string section leader
 Lawrence Feldman – bass clarinet
 Romero Lubambo – guitar
 Hiroshi Takano – guitar
 Jean-Baptiste Mondino – photography

References

1994 albums
Ryuichi Sakamoto albums
Albums produced by Ryuichi Sakamoto